Raju Bhai is a 2007 Indian Telugu-language drama film directed by Surya Kiran, starring Manoj Manchu and Sheela Kaur, with Dhandapani, Tanikella Bharani and Brahmanandam in supporting roles. The film, a remake of the successful 2006 Tamil film Chithiram Pesuthadi, directed by Myshkin was produced by Manoj's father, Mohan Babu, and was released on 18 May 2007  and was critically and commercially universally unsuccessful.

Cast

Soundtrack

The music was scored by noted Tamil musician Yuvan Shankar Raja. The soundtrack, which released on 28 April 2007, features 9 tracks with lyrics provided by Suddala Ashok Teja and Ramajogaiah Sastry. One of the songs, "Korameenu", was retained from the original Tamil film Chithiram Pesuthadi, composed by Sundar C. Babu, whilst two other songs were earlier used in a Tamil film.

The album became a "big hit" as the songs gained immense popularity upon release. Also reviews were very favorable, praising composer Yuvan Shankar Raja and describing his compositions as "superb", "a major strength to the movie" and "excellent".

References

External links
 

2007 films
Telugu remakes of Tamil films
2000s Telugu-language films